Bassett may refer to:

People 
 Bassett (surname)

Places 
United Kingdom
 Bassett, Southampton
 Bassett Green, a suburb of Southampton
 Bassetts Pole, Warwickshire
 Berwick Bassett, Wiltshire
 Charney Bassett, Oxfordshire
 Colston Bassett, Nottinghamshire
 Compton Bassett, Wiltshire
 Drayton Bassett, Staffordshire
 Dunton Bassett, Leicestershire
 North Weald Bassett, Essex
 Royal Wootton Bassett, Wiltshire
 Sutton Bassett, Northamptonshire
 Thorpe Bassett, North Yorkshire
 Winterbourne Bassett, Wiltshire

United States
 Bassett, California, Los Angeles County
 Bassett, Arkansas
 Bassett, Iowa
 Bassett, Kansas
 Bassett, Nebraska
 Bassett, Virginia
 Bassett, Wisconsin, an unincorporated community
 Bassett Hall, a mansion-sized plantation-style home in Colonial Williamsburg, Virginia, USA
 Bassetts Island, a propeller-shaped island within Pocasset Harbor and Red Brook Harbor, in Bourne, Massachusetts, USA

Other 
 USS Bassett (APD-73), a United States high-speed transport in commission from 1945 to 1946 and from 1950 to 1957; also its predecessor USS Bassett (DE-672)
 Bassett nicolo, a type of alto shawm (musical instrument)
 Bassett Furniture, an American furniture manufacturer
 Bassett-Lowke, a manufacturer of scale model locomotives and toys
 Harry Bassett, an American Thoroughbred racehorse
 Trebor Bassett, a manufacturer of sweets

See also 
 Basset (disambiguation)
 Basset hound
 Bissett (disambiguation)